Vanesa Magar (also known as Vanesa Magar Brunner) is a Franco-Mexican scientist who works at the Physical Oceanography Department, Ensenada Center for Scientific Research and Higher Education, Mexico, since 2014. She runs the Geophysical and Environmental Modelling Lab 
(https://ventummaris.com/gemlab/).

She specializes in coastal oceanography and applied meteorology, with a focus on wind and tidal energy. She served in the Board of Directors of the  Unión Geofísica Mexicana (Mexican Geophysical Union) as Secretary-General (2016-2017), Vice-President (2018-2019), and currently acts as President (2020-2021). Magar also serves as Academic Editor of PLOS ONE (since 2011), Invited Editor of PLOS "Responding to Climate Change Channel" (2017-2020), and Review Editor of "Frontiers in Marine Science - Ocean and Coastal Processes" (since 2014). She is a Chartered Mathematician (since 2008) and Fellow (since 2011) of the Institute of Mathematics and its Applications.

Early life and education 
Magar was born in 1971 to Roger Bernard Daniel Louis Magar Vincent (1936- ), a physicist and renewable energy specialist, and Palmira Brunner Liebshard (1940-2018), a biologist turned palaeontologist. She was educated at the Lycée Franco-Mexicain, the National Autonomous University of Mexico, and at Clare College and Wolfson College, Cambridge University.

After taking her Baccalauréat in Physics, Mathematics and Technology (Bac E) at the Lycée Franco-Mexicain in Mexico City in 1989, Magar moved to France and started a Diplôme d'études Universitaires Générales (DEUG, French for General Academic Studies Degree, corresponding to the first two years of the BSc) in Physics, Maths, Chemistry, and Technology at the University of Nantes.  But, after starting her second year of the DEUG at the University of Orléans, she decided to return to Mexico and started the Physics and Mathematics BSc degrees at the National Autonomous University of Mexico.

In 1992,  Magar was selected by NASA to take part in a space life sciences training programme at Kennedy Space Center, to celebrate International Space Year. Magar completed her Bachelors in physics at the National Autonomous University of Mexico in 1996. She obtained a certificate of Advanced Study in Mathematics from the Department of Applied Mathematics and Theoretical Physics (DAMTP), Cambridge University, Cambridge in 1997. She also did her PhD at the DAMTP, working on fluid dynamics with Tim Pedley. Together they studied the uptake of nutrients by swimming microorganisms. She graduated in 2001.

Research and publications 
Magar remained at the Department of Applied Mathematics and Theoretical Physics (DAMTP), Cambridge University, England, between 2001 and 2002, for her postdoctoral studies. She joined Bangor University in 2002, researching the transport of sediment above rippled beds. In 2005, she won a Research Councils UK Fellowship to work at the University of Plymouth.

She was appointed a lecturer in Coastal Engineering at the University of Plymouth in 2010. In 2014 she moved to the Ensenada Center for Scientific Research and Higher Education, where she was associate professor (2014-2021), then professor (since 2021) at the Physical Oceanography Department. She is the author of the book "Sediment Transport and Morphodynamics Modelling in Coasts and Shallow Environments", published by Taylor and Francis Press in 2020 (1st edition).

Select first-authored journal articles include:

 Magar, Vanesa; Godínez, Victor M.; Gross, Markus; López-Mariscal, Manuel; Bermúdez-Romero, Anahí; Candela, Julio; Zamudio, Luis. (2020, January). In-Stream Energy by Tidal and Wind-Driven Currents: An Analysis for the Gulf of California. Energies, 13(5): 1095. DOI: doi.org/10.3390/en13051095
 Magar, Vanesa; Gross, Markus; González-García, L. (2018). Offshore wind energy resource assessment under techno-economic and social-ecological constraints. Ocean & Coastal Management, 152: 77-87. DOI: 10.1016/j.ocecoaman.2017.10.007 
 Magar, Vanesa; Pedley, TJ. (2005). Average nutrient uptake by a self-propelled unsteady squirmer. Journal of Fluid Mechanics, 539: 93-112. DOI: 10.1017/S0022112005005768
 Magar, Vanesa; Goto, Tomonobu; Pedley, TJ. (2003). Nutrient Uptake by a Self‐Propelled Steady Squirmer. The Quarterly Journal of Mechanics and Applied Mathematics, 56(1): 65-91. DOI: 10.1093/qjmam/56.1.65

Books and book chapters as a lead/co-author include:

 Vanesa Magar. (2020). Sediment Transport and Morphodynamics Modelling for Coasts and Shallow Environments (1st edition). CRC Press. 
 Vanesa Magar. (2018). Tidal Current Technologies: Brief Overview and In-Depth Coverage of the State of the Art. In (Eduardo Rincón-Mejía & Alejandro de las Heras, Eds.) Sustainable Energy Technologies (1st edition). CRC Press. 
 Deborah Greaves, Carlos Perez‐Collazo, Curran Crawford, Bradley Buckham, Vanesa Magar, Francisco Acuña, Sungwon Shin, Hongda Shi, Chenyu. (2018). Regional Activities. In (Deborah Greaves & Gregorio Iglesias, Eds.) Wave and Tidal Energy. Wiley & Sons. DOI: 10.1002/9781119014492.ch13

Awards and honors

 2008 - Named a Chartered Mathematician 
 2011 - Fellow of the Institute of Mathematics and its Applications
 2012 - Fellow of the Software Sustainability Institute

Personal life
In 2009, she married Markus S. Gross, a geoscientist who also works at the Physical Oceanography Department, Ensenada Center for Scientific Research and Higher Education. They have one son, Damián Suré Gross-Magar (born 14 April 2010).

Sadly, Markus passed away on 25 January 2022.

References 

Mexican mathematicians
Mexican scientists
Mexican women mathematicians
21st-century Mexican scientists
Alumni of the University of Cambridge
National Autonomous University of Mexico alumni
Earth scientists
Women earth scientists
Living people
1971 births